Qazan may refer to:
 Qazan, Balkh, Afghanistan
 Qazan, Bamyan, Afghanistan
 Qazan, Iran, a village in West Azerbaijan Province, Iran
 Qazan, Kurdistan, a village in Kurdistan Province, Iran
 Qazan, South Khorasan, a village in South Khorasan Province, Iran
 Iske Qazan, a historical town in Russia
 Qazan Khan ibn Yasaur, ruler of the Chagatai Khanate in 1343 - 1346
 Kazan, sometimes spelt Qazan, a city in Russia

See also
Gazan (disambiguation)
Kazan (disambiguation)